The National Referral Spinal Injury Hospital is a National Level 6 hospital in Nairobi, Kenya.  It specializes in the treatment of spinal cord injuries.

History
The referral hospital was built in World War II to serve injured soldiers.  It was originally known as the Amani Cheshire Home. named for the donor of the original structure.

See also
Healthcare in Kenya

References

Hospitals in Kenya
Hospitals in Nairobi